Mukia may refer to
Mukia (moth), a genus of moths
Mukia (plant), a plant genus considered by some to be a synonym of Cucumis

See also 
 Mukhia (disambiguation)